In the Eye of the Beholder (Traditional Chinese: 秋香怒點唐伯虎) is a TVB costume drama series.

Synopsis
In search of the last model for his painting “Nine Pretty Women”, acclaimed scholar TONG BAK FU (Moses Chan) goes on a trip to Hangzhou with his ardent disciple WAT GEI (Johnson Lee) who is also like his bodyguard.

While there, he meets a pretty young maid from WAH’s Residence, CHAU HEUNG (Myolie Wu). FU is mesmerized by HEUNG’s beauty and martial agility and falls in love with her right away. In order to approach the girl, he disguises as a servant and assumes the pseudonym WAH ON, seeking to win her affections with his talent and ingenuity.

But contrary to his wishes, HEUNG is unmoved and even harbours an intense dislike for him after a series of misunderstandings. Master of the family WAH HUNG SHAN (Ha Yu) knew from the very beginning that FU is not a common man.  By the time his true identity is revealed, the scholar has already developed a close bond with the whole of the family, except HEUNG.

In the meantime, NING WONG (Savio Tsang), who has been attempting to rebel against Emperor CHING TAK (Lai Lok-yi), has managed to involve FU in his conspiracy by stratagem, thus getting the man and the WAHs into big trouble. NING’s daughter CHU TING YUK (Fala Chen) is in love with FU. Desperate to save her dream man, she forces LING to release FU by threatening to kill herself.

YUK’s consuming passion for FU seems to have caused a ripple of unease in HEUNG, who is starting to feel a little twinge of jealousy inside.
CHU TING YUK may be selfish and spoilt, but she later became a well-known artist, remaining single, while TONG BAK FU and HEUNG marry and settle down in Siam.

Cast

The Wah family

Imperial Palace

Other cast

Viewership ratings

References

External links
In the Eye of the Beholder (TVB.com) - Official Website 

TVB dramas
2010 Hong Kong television series debuts
2010 Hong Kong television series endings